is a Japanese television drama series that aired on Fuji TV from 20 October to 22 December 2008. Maki Horikita played the lead role as Kanon Akiyama. The screenwriter is Taeko Asano, who wrote the screenplay for Last Friends. The first episode received the viewership rating of 16.9% in Kantō region.

Cast
 Maki Horikita as Kanon Akiyama
 Yūjin Kitagawa as Junya Nagasaki
 Yuu Kashii as Mizuki Sakurai
 Seiji Fukushi as Yōji Akiyama
 Hiroki Narimiya as Subaru Segawa
 Yuki Uchida as Kiyoka Tōno
 Takashi Naitō as a priest
 Kōsuke Toyohara as Jirō Ikeda
 Mitsuru Hirata as Seitarō Akiyama

References

External links
  
 

Japanese drama television series
Fuji TV dramas
2008 Japanese television series debuts
2008 Japanese television series endings